Yi Xianlong (born 3 March 2001) is a Chinese footballer currently playing as a midfielder for Shandong Taishan.

Club career
In 2020 Yi Xianlong would be promoted to the senior team of Shandong Taishan before he would be loaned out to second tier club Jiangxi Beidamen, where he would make his debut in a league game on 13 September 2020 against Shaanxi Chang'an Athletic that ended in a 1-1 draw. This would be followed by his first goal of his career on 26 September 2020 in a league game against Guizhou Hengfeng that ended in a 3-1 defeat. The following season he would be loaned out to the China U20 who were allowed to participle within the 2021 China League Two division and then second tier club, Zhejiang Professional where he would aid the club in gaining promotion to the top tier at the end of the 2021 campaign. 

On his return to Shandong for the 2022 campaign, Yi would be included in a youth team squad to participate in the 2022 AFC Champions League as the senior team were unable to participate, due to the strict Chinese COVID-19 quarantine regulations. This would see Yi make his first appearance for Shandong in the 2022 AFC Champions League on 15 April 2022 against Daegu FC in a 7-0 defeat.

Career statistics
.

References

External links
Xianlong Yi at Worldfootball.net

2001 births
Living people
Chinese footballers
China youth international footballers
Association football midfielders
China League One players
China League Two players
Shandong Taishan F.C. players
Zhejiang Professional F.C. players